Austen Denis Childs (born 23 February 1989) is a New Zealand former tennis player.

Childs grew up in Mount Maunganui and was ranked amongst the world's top 50 players on the ITF Junior circuit, with a quarter-final appearance at the Australian Open a highlight.

Instead of professional tennis, Childs opted to attend college at the University of Louisville in Kentucky and play collegiate tennis. As a junior in 2010 and unseeded, he became the first New Zealander to make an NCAA Division I Championship final. He was beaten in the final by Bradley Klahn of Stanford.

Two-weeks after making the NCAA final he was called into the New Zealand Davis Cup team, captained by his childhood coach Marcel Vos, for a tie against Pakistan in Taranaki. Considered a surprise selection, Childs was used for the deciding fifth rubber, picked ahead of Michael Venus who had earlier played a lengthy match in losing to Aisam-ul-Haq Qureshi. Childs was able to defeat Aqeel Khan in straight sets to secure the tie for New Zealand.

See also
List of New Zealand Davis Cup team representatives

References

External links
 
 
 

1989 births
Living people
New Zealand male tennis players
People from Mount Maunganui
Sportspeople from the Bay of Plenty Region
Louisville Cardinals athletes
College men's tennis players in the United States